Pagmanella is a genus of moths of the family Crambidae. It contains only one species, Pagmanella heroica, which is found in Afghanistan.

References

Natural History Museum Lepidoptera genus database

Scopariinae
Crambidae genera
Monotypic moth genera